Joe Flood  may refer to:

 John Joe Flood (1899–1982), footballer
 Joe Flood (policy analyst) (born 1950), mathematician, housing economist, indicator specialist, genetic genealogist and author
 Joe Flood (musician) (born 1960), musician and songwriter